A sinusoidal waveform is said to have a unity amplitude when the amplitude of the wave is equal to 1.

where . This terminology is most commonly used in digital signal processing and is usually associated with the Fourier series and Fourier Transform sinusoids that involve a duty cycle, and a defined fundamental period, .

Analytic signals with unit amplitude satisfy the Bedrosian Theorem.

References

Digital signal processing